Denis Vladimirovich Chervyakov (born April 20, 1970 in Leningrad, Soviet Union (now Saint Petersburg, Russia)) is a retired Russian ice hockey defenceman who played two games for the Boston Bruins during the 1992–93 NHL season.

Playing career
Chervyakov was drafted 256th overall by the Bruins in the 1992 NHL Entry Draft.  After his two games, he spent the next three seasons with the Providence Bruins of the American Hockey League.  In 1996, he signed with the New York Islanders as a free-agent, but spent the entire season with the AHL's Kentucky Thoroughblades and never played a game for the Islanders.  Chervyakov moved to Finland's SM-liiga, suiting up for three teams in that season, Lukko, Tappara and Ässät.  He then returned to North America the next year, playing for four teams.  He began the year at the ECHL for the Baton Rouge Kingfish, after four games he moved to the Cincinnati Cyclones of the International Hockey League, he then played for the Orlando Solar Bears of the same league and rounded off the season in the AHL for the Portland Pirates.  He split 1999-00 between two countries, Västerås HK of the Swedish Elitserien and the Hannover Scorpions of the Deutsche Eishockey Liga in Germany.  He returned to the ECHL for the Augusta Lynx in 2000 which was his final season before retiring from hockey.

Career statistics

Regular season and playoffs

External links
 

1970 births
Ässät players
Atlanta Knights players
Augusta Lynx players
Baton Rouge Kingfish players
Boston Bruins draft picks
Boston Bruins players
Cincinnati Cyclones (IHL) players
Dinamo Riga players
Hannover Scorpions players
Kentucky Thoroughblades players
Living people
Lukko players
Orlando Solar Bears (IHL) players
Portland Pirates players
Providence Bruins players
Russian ice hockey defencemen
SKA Saint Petersburg players
Soviet ice hockey defencemen
Ice hockey people from Saint Petersburg
Tappara players
VIK Västerås HK players